Van Lierop is a Dutch toponymic surname meaning "from Lierop", a town in North Brabant. People with this name include:

Nikkie van Lierop (born 1963), German pop singer and synthesizer player
Robert Van Lierop (born 1939), American lawyer, film director, diplomat, activist and writer
Tonny van Lierop (1910–1982), Dutch field hockey player

References

Dutch-language surnames
Toponymic surnames
Surnames of Dutch origin